This is an alphabetical list of the main rivers on the island of Ireland. It includes rivers that flow through the Republic of Ireland and Northern Ireland. Rivers that flow through Northern Ireland are marked with an asterisk (*). There are over 70,000 km of waterways in the Republic of Ireland contained in 3,192 river water bodies including rivers, streams, and tributaries. The major rivers have their length (in miles and kilometres) given. Also shown are two tables. Table 1 shows the longest rivers in Ireland with their lengths (in miles and kilometres), the counties they flow through, and their catchment areas (in km2). Table 2 shows the largest rivers in Ireland (by mean flow) in cubic meters per second.

Longest Irish Rivers (with Basin areas) 
Lengths obtained from the Ordnance Survey of Ireland: Rivers and their Catchment Basins 1958 (Table of Reference), and for the rivers Bann and Erne - Notes on River Basins by Robert A. Williams
 TABLE 1
a 
 The River Shannon is a traditional freshwater river for just about 45% of its total length.

b 
 The total basin area of the Three Sisters (Barrow, Nore and Suir) is 9,207 km2.

c
 The traditional length given for the River Bann is 80 miles (129 km) which is the combined total length of Upper and Lower Bann rivers and doesn't include Lough Neagh.
 The total length of the Ulster Blackwater from its source to the sea via L. Neagh and the Lower Bann is 186.3 km (115.75 mi), surpassed, in Ireland, only by the Shannon and Barrow rivers.  This is the longest stream flow (source to sea) in Ulster.

d 
 The total basin area of the 6 km River Corrib is 3,138 km2
This is the longest stream flow (source to sea) within the Corrib Basin.

Largest Irish Rivers (by flow) 
 TABLE 2

a The River Shannon's 209 m3/s is to Limerick City (Catchment area: 11,700 km2). If the discharges from all of the rivers and streams into the Shannon Estuary (including the rivers Feale 34.6m3/s, Maigue 15.6m3/s, Fergus 25.7m3/s, and Deel 7.4m3/s) are added to the discharge at Limerick giving a total catchment of 16,865 km2, the total discharge of the River Shannon at its mouth at Loop Head reaches 300 m3/s

b The River Bann's 92 m3/s is to Movanagher Gauging station (Basin area 5209.8 km2). The 102.5 m3/s is based on the total basin area of 5808 km2
.

c The Three Sisters (Barrow, Nore & Suir) total flow into Waterford Harbour is 154 m3/s and the combined flow of the Barrow and Nore rivers is 86 m3/s before joining the river Suir near Waterford City.

A 

 Abbert River 
 Aghinrawn* (Fermanagh) See Owenbrean River
 Agivey*  (Londonderry)
 Aherlow River  (Tipperary)
 River Aille 
 Allaghaun River  (Limerick)
 River Allow  (Cork)
 Allow, County Cork (Blackwater) 
 Altalacky* (Londonderry)
 Annacloy* (Down)
 Annascaul (Kerry)
 River Annalee 
 River Anner  (Tipperary)
 River Ara  (Tipperary)
 Argideen River  (Cork)
 Arigna River 
 Arney* (Fermanagh)
 Athboy River  (Meath)
 Aughavaud River, County Carlow
 Aughrim River  (Wicklow)
 River Avoca (Ovoca)  (Wicklow)
 River Avonbeg  (Wicklow)
 River Avonmore  (Wicklow)
 Awbeg (Munster Blackwater)

B 
 Baelanabrack River 
 Baleally Stream, County Dublin
 River Ballinamallard* 
 Ballinascorney Stream, County Dublin
 Ballinderry River* 
 Ballinglen River, County Mayo
 Ballintotty River, County Tipperary
 Ballintra River 
 Ballisodare River 
 Ballyboghil River, County Dublin, aka Ballyboughal
 Ballycassidy*
 Ballyfinboy River 
 Ballymaice Stream, County Dublin
 Ballymeeny River, County Sligo
 Ballynahatty*
 Ballynahinch River*  
 Ballyogan Stream, County Dublin
 Balsaggart Stream, County Dublin
 Bandon 
 River Bann (Wexford) 
 Bann*  — longest river in Northern Ireland. Upper Bann flows into Lough Neagh and then continues north as the Lower Bann.

 Bannagh*
 Barrow 
 Bartramstown River, County Dublin
 Belderg River, County Mayo
 Bellanaminnaun River, County Mayo
 Bellawaddy River, County Sligo
 Bilboa River 
 River Black  County Mayo
 Blackbanks Stream, County Dublin
 Blackditch Stream, County Dublin
 Blackwater, Kerry
 River Blackwater, Kildare and Meath 
 River Blackwater, Cavan and Meath 
 Blackwater, Munster 
 River Blackwater (Ulster)* 
 Bloody Stream, Howth, County Dublin
 Boggeen Stream, County Dublin
 Boherboy Stream, County Dublin
 Boyle River (Total) 
 River Boyne 
 Bracken River, County Dublin
 Bracken, Balbriggan
 River Bradoge, County Dublin
 Breedoge River 
 River Bride  (Blackwater)
 River Bride  (Lee)
 Bride's Glen Stream, County Dublin
 Bride's Stream, County Dublin
 Broad Meadow River, County Dublin

 Brockey Stream, County Dublin
 Broghane Stream, County Kerry
 Brook Stream, County Dublin
 Brosna 
 Brownsbarn Stream, County Dublin
 Bungosteen River 
 Bunowen River (Galway) 
 Bunowen River (Mayo) 
 Bunratty River 
 Burn Dale, County Donegal
 Burntollet*
 Burren River 
 River Bush*

C 
 Cabragh River, County Sligo
 River Callan* 
 River Camac, County Dublin
 River Camcor 
 Camlin River 
 Camlough*
 River Camogue
 Camowen River* 
 Caragh River 
 Carey*
 Colin River*
 Carn River, County Mayo
 Carrickbrack Stream, County Dublin
 Carrickmines River, County Dublin
 River Clare (via Lough Corrib) 
 Carrowbeg 
 Carryduff*
 Carysfort-Maretimo Stream, County Dublin
 Cashla River 
 Castle Stream, County Dublin
 Castletown River 
 Cemetery Drain, County Dublin
 River Cladagh* (including Arney) 
 Clady River*
 Clanrye*
 Claremont Stream, County Dublin
 River Clarin 
 River Clodiagh 
 Clodiagh River 
 Cloghfin River 
 Cloonaghmore River 
Colebrooke River* 
 River Colligan 
 Commons Water, County Dublin
 Coolcour Brook, County Dublin
 Corduff River, County Dublin

 River Corrib 
 Cot Brook, County Dublin
 County Brook, County Dublin
 River Crana 
 Cregg River (via Lough Corrib)
 Creosote Stream, County Dublin
 Crinken Stream, County Dublin
 Crompaun River, County Clare
 Crumlin*
 Cuckoo Stream, County Dublin
 Cully Water 
 Cumber*
 Cummeragh River 
 Cusher River*

D 
 Dale River 
 Dall*
 River Dalua 
 River Dargle 
 River Dee, County Louth 
 River Deel 
 Deel River 
 River Deele  (see the Burn Dale)
 Dennett*
 River Derg* 
 Derreen River 
 River Derry 
 Delvin River, County Dublin
 Devlin River, County Sligo
 Dervock*
 River Diran 
 River Dodder 
 River Doonbeg 
 Dooyertha River 
 Drimnagh Castle Stream, County Dublin
 River Drish 
 Dromaddamore River, County Kerry
 Dromore River* 
 Drumquin River* 
 Drumragh River* 
 Duff* 
 Dun* (Glendun)

E 
 Easky River, County Sligo 
 Elm Park Stream, County Dublin
 Enler, County Down
 River Erkina 
 River Erne* 
 River Erriff 
 River Eske

F 
 River Fane, County Louth 
 Fairy Water 
 Farset*
 River Faughan* 
 River Feale 
 River Fergus 
 Feorish River 
 River Ferta, County Kerry
 Fettercairn Stream, County Dublin
 Fiddaun River, County Mayo
 Figile River (Kildare) 
 Finglas River, County Dublin
 Finglaswood Stream, County Dublin
 River Finisk 
 River Finn (County Donegal) (Foyle) — rises and flows mainly through County Donegal, Republic of Ireland 
 River Finn (Erne tributary) (Erne) 
 Finned River, County Sligo
 River Flesk 
 Flurry River, County Louth*
 Forrest Little Stream, County Dublin

 River Foyle*  (total) — that portion named "Foyle" forms the border between the Republic of Ireland and Northern Ireland
 Fox Stream, County Dublin
 Foxrock Stream, County Dublin
 River Funshion 
 Fury*
 Furry Glen Stream, County Dublin

G 
 River Galey 
 Gallanstown Stream, County Dublin
 Gallblack Stream, County Dublin
 River Garavogue (including L. Gill and R. Bonnet) 
 Gaybrook Stream, County Dublin
 Glashaboy River 
 Glashoreag River, County Kerry
 Glasthule Stream, County Dublin
 Glen*
 Glenamoy River County Mayo 
 Glenamuck Stream, County Dublin
 Glenariff*
 Glenaulin Stream, County Dublin
 Glencullen River, County Dublin and County Wicklow
 Glendergan*
 Glenelly River* 
 Glenglassera River, County Mayo
 Glenmornan*
 Glenulra River, County Mayo
 River Glore 
 River Glyde 
 Golf Stream, County Dublin
 River Goul 
 Grange Stream, County Dublin
 Grange River (Corrib) 
 River Greese 
 Griffeen River, County Dublin
 Grillagh River
 River Gweebarra 
 Gweestin River 
 Gweestion River (Moy)

H 
 Hampstead Stream, County Dublin
 Hazelbrook Stream, County Dublin
 Heathfield River, County Mayo
 Hurley River, County Dublin

I 
 River Ilen County Cork 
 River Inagh  
 River Inny (Leinster) 
 River Inny (County Kerry)

J 
 Jobstown Stream, County Dublin
 John's
 Joan Slade River, County Kildare

K 
 Keady*
 Kealy's Stream, County Dublin
 Kells*
 Kilbarrack Stream, County Dublin
 Kilbroney*
 Kilcolgan River 
 Kill o' the Grange Stream, County Dublin
 Kings River 
 Knockoneil River

L 

 River Lagan* 
 River Laune 
 Leaffony River, County Sligo 
 River Lee 
 River Lennon (Leannan) 
 River Liffey, County Wicklow, County Kildare, and County Dublin 
 Lissenhall Stream, County Dublin
 Little Brosna River 
 Little Dargle River, County Dublin
 Lung River (Boyle) 
 Lyreen River, County Kildare

M 
 Mabestown Stream, County Dublin
 Magazine Stream, County Dublin
 River Mahon 
 River Maigue 
 River Main* 
 River Maine 
 Mareen's Brook, County Dublin
 Manulla River 
 Mayne River, County Dublin
 Mill Stream, County Dublin
 Milverton Stream, County Dublin
 Monkstown Stream, County Dublin
 Mournebeg River* 
 Mourne*
 River Moy 
Moygannon River
 Moynalty River 
 Moyola River* 
 Muckross Stream, County Dublin
 Mulkear River 
 Munkin River, County Mayo

N 

 Naniken River, County Dublin
Nanny River. Meath
 Nenagh River 
 Newport River 
 Newry (Clanrye) River* 
 River Nore 
 Nutley Stream, County Dublin

O 
 Offington Stream, County Dublin
 Oily River 
 Ollatrim River (Tipperary) 
 Oona Water* 
 River Owenabue 
 Owenacurra River 
 Owenaher River, County Louth
 Owenass River, County Laois
 Owenbeg River 
 Owenbehy River, County Mayo
 Owenboliska River 
 Owenbrean* 5 mi (8.5 km)
 Owendoher River, County Dublin
 Owenduff River 
 Owenea River 
 Owengarve River 
 Owenglin River 
 Owenmore River (County Cavan) (Glangevlin) 
 Owenmore River (County Mayo) (via Carrowmore Lough) 
 Owenmore River (County Sligo) (via Templehouse Lough) 
 Owenkillew River 
 Owenreagh River 
 River Owenroe (Moynalty) 
 River Owentaraglen

P 
 Philipstown River (Barrow) 
 Pil River, County Kilkenny
 East Pinkeen Stream, County Dublin
 West Pinkeen Stream, County Dublin
 Piperstown Stream, County Dublin
 River Poddle, County Dublin
 Pollymounty River, County Carlow, also spelled Pollmounty or Poulmonty.
 Portrane Stream, County Dublin
 Priory Stream, County Dublin

Q 
 Quiggery*
 River Quoile

R 
 Racecourse Stream, County Dublin
 River Reelan* 
 Richardstown River, County Dublin
 River Robe (via Loughs Mask and Corrib) 
 Robinhood Stream, County Dublin
 River Roe* 
 Roogagh*
 Rosserk River, County Mayo
 Roughty River  (flowing into Kenmare Bay) at Kenmare
 Routing Burn 
 Rush Town Stream, County Dublin
 River Rye

S 

 St. Laurence's Stream, County Dublin
 St. Margaret's Stream, County Dublin
 Santa Sabina Stream, County Dublin
 Santry River, County Dublin
 Scribblestown Stream, County Dublin
 Shallon Stream, County Dublin
 Shanganagh River, County Dublin
 River Shannon  — longest river on the island. Develops into Lough Allen, Lough Bofin, Lough Ree and Lough Derg along its course.
 Shanow River 
 Shimna*
 River Shiven 
 Shournagh River 
 Sillees River* 
 Silver River 
 Six Mile Water* 
 Slade Brook, County Dublin
 River Slaney, County Wicklow, County Carlow and County Wexford 
 Slang River, County Dublin
 River Slate 
 Sluice River, County Dublin
 Smerlagh (Smaorlagh) River 
 Sruh Croppa*
 Stein River, County Dublin
 Stonestown River 
 Stoneyford
 River Strule* 
 River Suck 
 River Suir 
 River Sullane 
 Swan River, County Dublin
 River Swanlinbar  (also known as Cladagh)*
 River Swilly

T 
 Tallaght Stream, County Dublin
 River Tall* 
 River Tang 
 River Tar 

 Torrent*
 Tempo*
 Termon*
 Three Arches*
 Threemilewater*
 River Tolka 
 River Torrent* 
 River Triogue 
 Trimleston Stream, County Dublin
 Tromanallison, County Dublin
 Tullamore River 
 Turnapin Stream, County Dublin
 Turvey River, County Dublin

U 
 Unshin River 
 Upper Ballinderry*

V 
 River Vartry, County Wicklow 
 Viceregal Stream, County Dublin

W 
 Wad River, County Dublin
 Walkinstown Stream, County Dublin
 Ward River, County Dublin
 Ward River, Fingal
 White River, County Limerick
 White River, County Louth
 Whitechurch Stream, County Dublin
 Whitewater Brook, County Dublin
 Wimbletown Stream, County Dublin
 River Womanagh 
 River Woodford

Y 
 Yellow River

See also 

 Rivers of Ireland
 List of rivers of County Dublin
 List of rivers of County Mayo
 List of canals in Ireland
 List of loughs in Ireland
 Waterways Ireland
 Rivers Agency

References

External sources
 Irish whitewater River Guides

Rivers of Ireland
Ireland
Rivers
Drainage basins of Ireland